Claudin-17 is a protein that in humans is encoded by the CLDN17 gene. It belongs to the group of claudins; claudins are cell-cell junction proteins that keep that maintains cell- and tissue-barrier function. It forms anion-selective paracellular channels and is localized mainly in kidney proximal tubules.

References

External links

Further reading

 

Proteins
Genes